Alive 1997 is the first live album by French electronic music duo Daft Punk, released on 1 October 2001 by Virgin Records. It contains a 45-minute excerpt of a live performance recorded during Daftendirektour at Birmingham's Que Club on 8 November 1997. The album was generally positively received by critics, and peaked at number 25 on the French Albums Chart.

Background
The album was initially released online as part of the Daft Club service. Early pressings of the Daft Punk album Discovery contained a card that would allow access to the Daft Club website containing remixes and the live recording. The Daft Club service ended in 2003. The performance at Birmingham's Que Club was considered by Daft Punk to be one of their favorite live sets at the time of its release.

Alive 1997 prominently features elements of "Daftendirekt", "Da Funk", "Rollin' & Scratchin'", "Revolution 909" and "Alive" from their Homework album. There are also prominent elements of Armand Van Helden's "Ten Minutes of Funk" remix of "Da Funk". The live performance also contains elements of what would later become the track "Short Circuit" featured in Discovery.

Alive 1997 contains the 45-minute excerpt as a continuous track. The physical releases contain no tracklisting. The CD and vinyl packaging included a set of Daft Punk stickers. The layout for the album was done by Åbäke, and the photography by Serge Paulet. In 2022, the album was reissued for the 25th anniversary of Homework.

Critical reception
Reception to Alive 1997 was generally positive upon release. John Bush of AllMusic noted how "radically different" the live versions of Daft Punk's tracks are compared to the originals, and that the release accurately captured the energy of the stage show. Fiona Reid of Hot Press felt that the audible audience enhanced the record, making it reminiscent to sound effects heard in Homework. An NME review called Alive 1997 "an immaculately executed product", expressing that it was preferred over the "sleek sophistication" of Discovery. Sputnikmusic also felt that it was superior to the duo's later live album Alive 2007, in particular highlighting the singular continuous flow of the 1997 performance. Q called Alive 1997 "45 minutes of breathless electronic excitement" while Uncut wrote that it "has a shrill rawness that vividly captures a night of sweat-stained gymnastics".

Personnel
Adapted from the Alive 1997 liner notes.

 Daft Punk – production, writing
 Serge Paulet – photography
 Åbäke – layout
 Janvier – photo retouching

Charts

References

External links

Daft Punk live albums
2001 live albums
Virgin Records live albums
Albums produced by Thomas Bangalter
Albums produced by Guy-Manuel de Homem-Christo